The Lunar Surface Electromagnetics Experiment (LuSEE-Night) is a planned robotic radio telescope observatory designed to land and function on the far side of Earth's Moon. The project is under development by the U.S. Department of Energy and the National Aeronautics and Space Administration. If successfully deployed and activated, LuSEE-Night will attempt measurements of an early period of the history of the Universe that occurred relatively soon after the Big Bang, referred to as the Dark Ages of the Universe, which predates the formation of luminous stars and galaxies. The instrument is planned to be landed on the lunar far side as soon as 2026 aboard the Blue ghost lunar lander. LuSEE-Night, not to be confused with a companion lander planned for lunar landing in 2024 named LuSEE-Lite, is to be delivered to the lunar far side by Commercial Lunar Payload Services (CLPS).

See also 
 Lunar Crater Radio Telescope
Chronology of the universe
Large Aperture Experiment to Detect the Dark Ages

References

External links 
March 2023 NASA LuSEE-Night statement
LuSee-Night home page

Space probes
Moon
Radio telescopes
Astronomical instruments